Howard Landis Bevis (November 19, 1885 – April 24, 1968) was the 7th President of Ohio State University. Bevis received a bachelor's degree from the University of Cincinnati in 1908, a degree from University of Cincinnati College of Law in 1910. He served in the Ordnance Department of the United States Army during World War I, and later was chief of the legal section of the finance division of the Army Air Corps. He received a law degree from Harvard Law School in 1920. He went on to practice law in Cincinnati, Ohio and served on the faculty of the University of Cincinnati College of Law. The governor appointed Bevis to the Ohio Supreme Court in 1933 to fill a vacancy. Bevis did not run for election to a full term and accepted a position as Ziegler Professor in Law and Government on the faculty of Harvard in business and public administration. Bevis was Ohio state finance director before becoming President of Ohio State in 1940.

During his tenure as President of the Ohio State University, Bevis, having served as a civilian in ordnance and the legal section of the Air Service, refused to cap the number of veterans admitted under the GI Bill, as other colleges had done. Despite the wishes of many on the faculty, enrollment grew from 12,000 in 1946 to 26,000 a year later. President Eisenhower appointed him as chair of the Committee on Scientists and Engineers, which sat from 1956 to 1958. He was elected a Fellow of the American Academy of Arts and Sciences in 1985.

Bevis Hall on Ohio State's Columbus campus is named in his honor.

References

Further reading
Past Presidents of the Ohio State University
Bevis Hall at Ohio State University

1885 births
1968 deaths
Fellows of the American Academy of Arts and Sciences
Harvard Law School alumni
Harvard Law School faculty
Presidents of Ohio State University
University of Cincinnati alumni
University of Cincinnati College of Law faculty
Justices of the Ohio Supreme Court
University of Cincinnati College of Law alumni
United States Army personnel of World War I
United States Army soldiers
20th-century American judges
Ohio Democrats
20th-century American academics